James Mathewson (died January 9, 1843) was an Irish-born miller, lumberman and political figure in Upper Canada. He represented Frontenac in the Legislative Assembly of Upper Canada from 1836 to 1841 as a Conservative.

He was born in County Antrim. Mathewson lived in Pittsburgh Mills, Pittsburgh Township. He was a justice of the peace for the Midland District. Mathewson was an Anglican. He died in Pittsburgh Mills.

References 

Year of birth missing
1843 deaths
Members of the Legislative Assembly of Upper Canada
Canadian justices of the peace